Eat/Kiss: Music for the Films by Andy Warhol is a soundtrack album by Welsh multi-instrumentalist and composer John Cale. It was released in 1997 on Hannibal Records. Cale composed this music for a screening of two Andy Warhol films, Eat and Kiss. It was premiered in 1994 with two other The Velvet Underground members, guitarist Sterling Morrison and drummer Maureen Tucker. The band included Dave Soldier and the Soldier String Quartet and pedal steel guitarist B.J. Cole. An album version was recorded next year without Morrison in Lille, France.

Track listing
Part 1 − Kiss
"Movement 01" − 2:59
"Movement 02" − 7:33
"Movement 03" − 4:30
"Movement 04" − 3:48
"Movement 05" − 1:58
"Movement 06" − 5:21
"Movement 07" − 1:52
"Movement 08" − 1:15
"Movement 09" − 5:14
"Movement 10" − 4:33
"Movement 11" − 6:14
Part 2 − Eat
"Movement 12" − 8:22
"Movement 13" − 7:01
"Movement 14" − 3:56
"Movement 15" − 2:04

Personnel
John Cale − keyboards, composer
B. J. Cole − pedal steel guitar, piano
The Soldier String Quartet featuring
David Soldier − 12 string guitar, violin, metal violin, arranger
Todd Reynolds − violin
Martha Mooke − viola
Dawn Buckholtz − cello
Jimmy Justice, Tiye' Giraud − vocals
Maureen Tucker − percussion
Martin Brass − engineer

References

John Cale soundtracks
1997 soundtrack albums
Albums produced by John Cale